The World Organization of Workers (WOW) is an international trade union federation.

History
WOW was founded in September 1921, as the International Federation of Christian Employees' Trade Unions.  After several name changes, it became the World Federation of Clerical Workers (WFCW).  The WFCW joined the International Federation of Christian Trade Unions (IFCTU), which was later called the World Confederation of Labour (WCL). On October 31, 2006, the WCL was dissolved when it joined with the International Confederation of Free Trade Unions to form the International Trade Union Confederation (ITUC). Rather than join ITUC, the WFCW decided to function as an independent trade union federation under the name World Organization of Workers (WOW).

Malta World Congress
WOW held its first World Congress from November 2 to 9, 2008, in Malta. It was at this conference that the name World Organization of Workers (WOW) was formally adopted. Also at this conference two resolutions were adopted. The first resolution dealt with Social dialogue, International Labour Standards and Social Justice. The second resolution promoted a new balance within corporate governance structures.

Organization
Currently, 130 trade unions are affiliated with WOW, representing 1.3 million workers from 60 nations. The president is Wayne Prins, the executive director of the Christian Labour Association of Canada (CLAC). WOW's headquarters are in Brussels, Belgium.

The federation's 2019 congress was attended by the following unions:

ASIPA (Spain)
CFTL (Portugal)
CGB (Germany)
KOK (Czech Republic)
CNV (Netherlands)
FCG (Austria)
Krifa (Denmark)
Solidarity (Poland)
SS Bofos (Serbia)
Vost "Volya" (Ukraine)
Voice (United Kingdom)
Christian Labour Association of Canada (Canada)

Structure
The WOW Congress meets every 4 years, consisting of delegates of affiliated organizations. The European Council meets every 4 years, between the sessions of the WOW Congress.  The European Council consists of at least one representative of each European member organization. The World Board meets annually, consisting of at least 6 Vice-Presidents, Treasurer and the World-President. The European Board meets at least 4 times a year.

See also

 List of federations of trade unions

References

External links

International and regional union federations
Trade unions established in 1921
Christian trade unions